The following species in the flowering plant genus Verbascum, the mulleins, are accepted by Plants of the World Online. Verbascum has recently undergone rapid radiation.

Verbascum × abandense 
Verbascum abieticola 
Verbascum abyadicum 
Verbascum acaule 
Verbascum adamovicii 
Verbascum adeliae 
Verbascum adenanthum 
Verbascum adenocarpum 
Verbascum adenocaulon 
Verbascum adenophorum 
Verbascum adrianopolitanum 
Verbascum adzharicum 
Verbascum afyonense 
Verbascum agastachyum 
Verbascum agrimoniifolium 
Verbascum akdarense 
Verbascum akhalkalakiense 
Verbascum albidiflorum 
Verbascum alceoides 
Verbascum alepense 
Verbascum aliciae 
Verbascum alpigenum 
Verbascum alyssifolium 
Verbascum × amaliense 
Verbascum amanum 
Verbascum × ambigens 
Verbascum × ambiguum 
Verbascum × ambracicum 
Verbascum anastasii 
Verbascum ancyritanum 
Verbascum andrusii 
Verbascum anisophyllum 
Verbascum antari 
Verbascum antilibanoticum 
Verbascum antinori 
Verbascum antiochium 
Verbascum antitauricum 
Verbascum aphentulium 
Verbascum apiculatum 
Verbascum aqranse 
Verbascum × arabkirense 
Verbascum × araratense 
Verbascum arbelense 
Verbascum arbusculum 
Verbascum × arctotrichum 
Verbascum arcturus 
Verbascum × arenicola 
Verbascum argenteum 
Verbascum armenum 
Verbascum × arpaczajicum 
Verbascum artvinense 
Verbascum aschersonii 
Verbascum asiricum 
Verbascum asperuloides 
Verbascum assurense 
Verbascum × atchleyianum 
Verbascum atlanticum 
Verbascum atroviolaceum 
Verbascum aucheri 
Verbascum auriculatum 
Verbascum × austroanatolicum 
Verbascum austroiranicum 
Verbascum aydogdui 
Verbascum azerbaijanense 
Verbascum baldaccii 
Verbascum × balikesirense 
Verbascum ballii 
Verbascum ballsianum 
Verbascum banaticum 
Verbascum barbeyi 
Verbascum barnadesii 
Verbascum basivelatum 
Verbascum × bastardii 
Verbascum battandieri 
Verbascum × baumgartnerianum 
Verbascum bellum 
Verbascum benthamianum 
Verbascum beryteum 
Verbascum betonicifolium 
Verbascum biledschikianum 
Verbascum × binbogense 
Verbascum birandianum 
Verbascum biscutellifolium 
Verbascum bithynicum 
Verbascum × bitlisianum 
Verbascum blancheanum 
Verbascum blattaria 
Verbascum boerhavii 
Verbascum boevae 
Verbascum boissieri 
Verbascum bombyciferum 
Verbascum × borbasianum 
Verbascum bornmuellerianum 
Verbascum botuliforme 
Verbascum bourgeauanum 
Verbascum bracteosum 
Verbascum × brockmuelleri 
Verbascum bugulifolium 
Verbascum × bulanikense 
Verbascum × burdurense 
Verbascum caesareum 
Verbascum × calcicola 
Verbascum calvum 
Verbascum calycinum 
Verbascum calycosum 
Verbascum campestre 
Verbascum × candelabrum 
Verbascum capitis-viridis 
Verbascum cappadocicum 
Verbascum carduchorum 
Verbascum cariense 
Verbascum × carinthiacum 
Verbascum carmanicum 
Verbascum caudatum 
Verbascum cedreti 
Verbascum × cephalariense 
Verbascum cerinum 
Verbascum × cernyi 
Verbascum chaixii 
Verbascum charidemi 
Verbascum charputense 
Verbascum chaudharyanum 
Verbascum chazaliei 
Verbascum cheiranthifolium 
Verbascum chionophyllum 
Verbascum chiovendae 
Verbascum × chium 
Verbascum chlorostegium 
Verbascum chrysochaete 
Verbascum × chrysopolitanum 
Verbascum chrysorrhacos 
Verbascum cicekdagensis 
Verbascum cilicicum 
Verbascum cilicium 
Verbascum × clinantherum 
Verbascum × coenobitanum 
Verbascum × congestum 
Verbascum conocarpum 
Verbascum corinthiacum 
Verbascum coromandelianum 
Verbascum coronopifolium 
Verbascum × coum 
Verbascum × crenulatum 
Verbascum creticum 
Verbascum cucullatibracteum 
Verbascum cylindrocarpum 
Verbascum cylleneum 
Verbascum cymigerum 
Verbascum cystolithicum 
Verbascum daenzeri 
Verbascum dalamanicum 
Verbascum damascenum 
Verbascum × danubiale 
Verbascum davidoffii 
Verbascum davisianum 
Verbascum decaisneanum 
Verbascum × decalvans 
Verbascum decorum 
Verbascum decursivum 
Verbascum × degenianum 
Verbascum delphicum 
Verbascum demirizianum 
Verbascum densiflorum 
Verbascum dentifolium 
Verbascum × denudatum 
Verbascum × derekolense 
Verbascum × dervichorum 
Verbascum detersile 
Verbascum dieckianum 
Verbascum × digitalifolium 
Verbascum dimoniei 
Verbascum dingleri 
Verbascum × diphyon 
Verbascum × dirmilense 
Verbascum × dirupatae 
Verbascum discolor 
Verbascum disjectum 
Verbascum × divaricatum 
Verbascum diversifolium 
Verbascum × dobrogense 
Verbascum × doiranense 
Verbascum × dominii 
Verbascum × dramense 
Verbascum drymophilum 
Verbascum drymophyloides 
Verbascum × duernsteinense 
Verbascum dumulosum 
Verbascum × dupnicense 
Verbascum durmitoreum 
Verbascum duzgunbabadagensis 
Verbascum × edessanum 
Verbascum × edremiticum 
Verbascum × eginense 
Verbascum × elasigense 
Verbascum elegantulum 
Verbascum eleonorae 
Verbascum epixanthinum 
Verbascum eremobium 
Verbascum ergin-hamzaoglui 
Verbascum erianthum 
Verbascum eriocarpum 
Verbascum eriophorum 
Verbascum eriorrhabdon 
Verbascum erivanicum 
Verbascum × ermenekense 
Verbascum erosum 
Verbascum × erraticum 
Verbascum × ersin-yucelii 
Verbascum × erzindschanense 
Verbascum eskisehirensis 
Verbascum euboicum 
Verbascum euphraticum 
Verbascum exuberans 
Verbascum faik-karaveliogullarii 
Verbascum × fallax 
Verbascum farsistanicum 
Verbascum faurei 
Verbascum × festii 
Verbascum flavidum 
Verbascum flavipannosum 
Verbascum × florinense 
Verbascum × fluminense 
Verbascum foetidum 
Verbascum fontqueri 
Verbascum formosum 
Verbascum × fragriforme 
Verbascum × freynianum 
Verbascum freynii 
Verbascum × fridae 
Verbascum froedinii 
Verbascum fruticulosum 
Verbascum gabrieliae 
Verbascum × gabrielianae 
Verbascum gaetulum 
Verbascum gaillardotii 
Verbascum galilaeum 
Verbascum × geminatum 
Verbascum geminiflorum 
Verbascum georgicum 
Verbascum germaniciae 
Verbascum giganteum 
Verbascum gilanicum 
Verbascum gimgimense 
Verbascum × gintlii 
Verbascum × giresunense 
Verbascum glabratum 
Verbascum glanduliferum 
Verbascum glandulosum 
Verbascum globiferum 
Verbascum globiflorum 
Verbascum glomeratum 
Verbascum glomerulosum 
Verbascum gnaphalodes 
Verbascum × godronii 
Verbascum × goeldschuekense 
Verbascum golawanense 
Verbascum gossypinum 
Verbascum gracilescens 
Verbascum graecum 
Verbascum × guelnarense 
Verbascum guicciardii 
Verbascum gypsicola 
Verbascum hadschinense 
Verbascum haesarense 
Verbascum hajastanicum 
Verbascum halacsyanum 
Verbascum haraldi-adnani 
Verbascum hasbenlii 
Verbascum × hatayense 
Verbascum haussknechtianum 
Verbascum haussknechtii 
Verbascum × haynaldianum 
Verbascum helianthemoides 
Verbascum hema-figranum 
Verbascum hervieri 
Verbascum herzogii 
Verbascum heterobarbatum 
Verbascum heterodontum 
Verbascum hookerianum 
Verbascum × horakii 
Verbascum × horticola 
Verbascum humile 
Verbascum × humnickii 
Verbascum × hybridum 
Verbascum hypoleucum 
Verbascum ibrahim-belenlii 
Verbascum iconium 
Verbascum ifranensis 
Verbascum × ignescens 
Verbascum ikaricum 
Verbascum × ilgazdagense 
Verbascum inaequale 
Verbascum × incanum 
Verbascum × inegoelense 
Verbascum × inexspectatum 
Verbascum infidelium 
Verbascum × innominatum 
Verbascum × insignitum 
Verbascum insulare 
Verbascum × interjectum 
Verbascum × intermedium 
Verbascum interruptum 
Verbascum intricatum 
Verbascum × inulifolioides 
Verbascum inulifolium 
Verbascum isauricum 
Verbascum × isfendiyarense 
Verbascum × iskenderunense 
Verbascum × ispartense 
Verbascum jankaeanum 
Verbascum × johannis-zernyi 
Verbascum jordanicum 
Verbascum jordanovii 
Verbascum josgadense 
Verbascum juruk 
Verbascum × kalabakense 
Verbascum × karaboertlenense 
Verbascum × karadagense 
Verbascum × karlikdaghense 
Verbascum × karpatii 
Verbascum kastamunicum 
Verbascum × kavallense 
Verbascum × kavinae 
Verbascum × kayseriense 
Verbascum × keklikolukense 
Verbascum × kemerense 
Verbascum × kerneri 
Verbascum kochiiforme 
Verbascum korovinii 
Verbascum × korphiaticum 
Verbascum kotschyi 
Verbascum × kozaniense 
Verbascum krauseanum 
Verbascum × krokeense 
Verbascum × kubedagense 
Verbascum × kuetahyense 
Verbascum kurdicum 
Verbascum kurdistanicum 
Verbascum lachnopus 
Verbascum laetum 
Verbascum lagurus 
Verbascum lanatum 
Verbascum × laramberguei 
Verbascum × lasianthiforme 
Verbascum lasianthum 
Verbascum latisepalum 
Verbascum leianthoides 
Verbascum leianthum 
Verbascum × leilense 
Verbascum leiocarpum 
Verbascum leiocladum 
Verbascum × lemaitrei 
Verbascum leptocladum 
Verbascum leptostachyon 
Verbascum letourneuxii 
Verbascum leuconeurum 
Verbascum × leucophylloides 
Verbascum leucophyllum 
Verbascum levanticum 
Verbascum libanoticum 
Verbascum limnense 
Verbascum lindae 
Verbascum linearilobum 
Verbascum linguifolium 
Verbascum litigiosum 
Verbascum lobatum 
Verbascum × lobulatum 
Verbascum × longeracemosum 
Verbascum longibracteatum 
Verbascum longifolium 
Verbascum longipedicellatum 
Verbascum longirostre 
Verbascum luciliae 
Verbascum luntii 
Verbascum luridiflorum 
Verbascum lychnitis 
Verbascum lydium 
Verbascum lyprocarpum 
Verbascum lyratifolium 
Verbascum lysiosepalum 
Verbascum macedonicum 
Verbascum × macilentum 
Verbascum macrocarpum 
Verbascum macrosepalum 
Verbascum macrurum 
Verbascum maeandri 
Verbascum × maeandriforme 
Verbascum mairei 
Verbascum mallophorum 
Verbascum maroccanum 
Verbascum × martini 
Verbascum masguindalii 
Verbascum maurum 
Verbascum mecit-vuralii 
Verbascum medinecum 
Verbascum megricum 
Verbascum meinckeanum 
Verbascum melhanense 
Verbascum melitenense 
Verbascum microsepalum 
Verbascum × mirabile 
Verbascum misirdalianum 
Verbascum × mixtum 
Verbascum × montenegrinum 
Verbascum × morronense 
Verbascum × mucronatiforme 
Verbascum mucronatum 
Verbascum mughlaeum 
Verbascum × muglense 
Verbascum murbeckianum 
Verbascum × murbeckii 
Verbascum × mutense 
Verbascum mykales 
Verbascum myrianthum 
Verbascum × myriocarpoides 
Verbascum myriocarpum 
Verbascum × mytilinense 
Verbascum napifolium 
Verbascum natolicum 
Verbascum × neilreichii 
Verbascum nevadense 
Verbascum nicolai 
Verbascum nigrum 
Verbascum nihatgoekyigitii 
Verbascum niveum 
Verbascum nobile 
Verbascum × nothum 
Verbascum × nudatiforme 
Verbascum nudatum 
Verbascum nudicaule 
Verbascum nudiusculum 
Verbascum × nusaybinense 
Verbascum × nydeggeri 
Verbascum × obtusifoliiforme 
Verbascum × obtusifolioides 
Verbascum obtusifolium 
Verbascum olympicum 
Verbascum omanense 
Verbascum × omissum 
Verbascum oocarpum 
Verbascum orbicularifolium 
Verbascum × ordymnense 
Verbascum oreodoxa 
Verbascum × oreodoxiforme 
Verbascum oreophilum 
Verbascum orgyale 
Verbascum orientale 
Verbascum orphanideum 
Verbascum ovalifolium 
Verbascum ozturkii 
Verbascum pallidiflorum 
Verbascum palmyrense 
Verbascum × pancicii 
Verbascum pangaeum 
Verbascum paniculatum 
Verbascum × paphlagonicum 
Verbascum × paradoxum 
Verbascum × parallelum 
Verbascum parsana 
Verbascum × parvifloriforme 
Verbascum parviflorum 
Verbascum × patris 
Verbascum pedunculosum 
Verbascum × pelitnopilodes 
Verbascum pellitum 
Verbascum pentelicum 
Verbascum peraffine 
Verbascum pestalozzae 
Verbascum petiolare 
Verbascum petrae 
Verbascum × phalereum 
Verbascum × philippiense 
Verbascum phlomoides 
Verbascum × phoeniceiforme 
Verbascum phoeniceum 
Verbascum phrygium 
Verbascum phyllostachyum 
Verbascum pinardii 
Verbascum pinetorum 
Verbascum pinnatifidum 
Verbascum pinnatisectum 
Verbascum piscicidum 
Verbascum × pobicum 
Verbascum × polyphyllopyramidatum 
Verbascum ponticum 
Verbascum porteri 
Verbascum postianum 
Verbascum × pozanticum 
Verbascum × praetutianum 
Verbascum × prokopiense 
Verbascum protractum 
Verbascum prunellii 
Verbascum × prusianiforme 
Verbascum prusianum 
Verbascum × pseudobanaticum 
Verbascum × pseudoblattaria 
Verbascum × pseudochrysochaete 
Verbascum pseudocreticum 
Verbascum pseudodigitalis 
Verbascum × pseudogeorgicum 
Verbascum × pseudohajastanicum 
Verbascum pseudoholotrichum 
Verbascum × pseudolychnitis 
Verbascum × pseudolydium 
Verbascum pseudonobile 
Verbascum × pseudopterocalycinum 
Verbascum × pseudosinuatum 
Verbascum × pseudosoongaricum 
Verbascum × pseudospeciosum 
Verbascum × pseudothapsus 
Verbascum pseudovarians 
Verbascum × pterocalyciniforme 
Verbascum pterocalycinum 
Verbascum × pterocaulon 
Verbascum pterocladum 
Verbascum ptychophyllum 
Verbascum pubescens 
Verbascum pulverulentum 
Verbascum pumiliforme 
Verbascum pumilum 
Verbascum punalense 
Verbascum purpureum 
Verbascum pycnostachyum 
Verbascum pyramidatum 
Verbascum pyroliforme 
Verbascum × quercetorum 
Verbascum qulebicum 
Verbascum racemiferum 
Verbascum × ramigerum 
Verbascum reeseanum 
Verbascum × regelianum 
Verbascum reiseri 
Verbascum renzii 
Verbascum × rhodium 
Verbascum × rilaense 
Verbascum × roopianum 
Verbascum roripifolium 
Verbascum rotundifolium 
Verbascum × rubiginosum 
Verbascum rubricaule 
Verbascum × rumiciforme 
Verbascum rupestre 
Verbascum rupicola 
Verbascum × ruscinonense 
Verbascum saccatum 
Verbascum × sakaryense 
Verbascum salgirensis 
Verbascum × salmoneum 
Verbascum salviifolium 
Verbascum × samium 
Verbascum samniticum 
Verbascum × sarikamischense 
Verbascum scabridum 
Verbascum scamandri 
Verbascum scaposum 
Verbascum schachdagense 
Verbascum × schaklavense 
Verbascum schimperianum 
Verbascum × schottianum 
Verbascum scoparium 
Verbascum sedgwickianum 
Verbascum × selimense 
Verbascum × semialbum 
Verbascum × semilanatum 
Verbascum × semirigidum 
Verbascum × semisplendidum 
Verbascum × semiundulatum 
Verbascum × semivulcanicum 
Verbascum serpenticola 
Verbascum serratifolium 
Verbascum sessiliflorum 
Verbascum × sevanense 
Verbascum seydisehirense 
Verbascum shahsavarensis 
Verbascum sheilae 
Verbascum shiqricum 
Verbascum × siatistense 
Verbascum × sibyllinum 
Verbascum siculum 
Verbascum × silifkense 
Verbascum × silvanense 
Verbascum simavicum 
Verbascum × simonianum 
Verbascum simplex 
Verbascum sinaiticum 
Verbascum × sinuatifolium 
Verbascum sinuatum 
Verbascum × sivasicum 
Verbascum × skamneliense 
Verbascum smyrnaeum 
Verbascum songaricum 
Verbascum sorgerae 
Verbascum spathulisepalum 
Verbascum × speciosiforme 
Verbascum speciosum 
Verbascum sphenandroides 
Verbascum spinosum 
Verbascum splendidum 
Verbascum spodiotrichum 
Verbascum stachydifolium 
Verbascum stachydiforme 
Verbascum stelurum 
Verbascum × steniense 
Verbascum stenocarpum 
Verbascum stenostachyum 
Verbascum stepporum 
Verbascum × sterile 
Verbascum straussii 
Verbascum × stribrny 
Verbascum strictum 
Verbascum × subantinori 
Verbascum × subcaudatum 
Verbascum × subcheiranthifolium 
Verbascum × subcymosum 
Verbascum × suberiocarpum 
Verbascum × sublasianthum 
Verbascum sublobatum 
Verbascum × submesopotamicum 
Verbascum subnivale 
Verbascum × subphlomoides 
Verbascum subserratum 
Verbascum × subsplendidum 
Verbascum × subvacillans 
Verbascum sudanicum 
Verbascum × sultanense 
Verbascum suworowianum 
Verbascum symes 
Verbascum syriacum 
Verbascum szovitsianum 
Verbascum tabukum 
Verbascum × tamderense 
Verbascum tauri 
Verbascum × tauricum 
Verbascum × tekirovense 
Verbascum tenue 
Verbascum tenuicaule 
Verbascum × terdschanense 
Verbascum tetrandrum 
Verbascum × thapsi 
Verbascum thapsus 
Verbascum × thessalum 
Verbascum tiberiadis 
Verbascum tibesticum 
Verbascum × tomentosulum 
Verbascum × torculifragum 
Verbascum tossiense 
Verbascum transcaucasicum 
Verbascum transjordanicum 
Verbascum transolympicum 
Verbascum trapifolium 
Verbascum trichostylum 
Verbascum tripolitanum 
Verbascum tropidocarpum 
Verbascum × tschamlibelense 
Verbascum × tschilemelekdagense 
Verbascum × tschivrilense 
Verbascum tuna-ekimii 
Verbascum × tundscheliense 
Verbascum turcicum 
Verbascum turcomanicum 
Verbascum turkestanicum 
Verbascum tzar-borisii 
Verbascum undulatum 
Verbascum urceolatum 
Verbascum urobracteum 
Verbascum urumoffii 
Verbascum uschakense 
Verbascum × ustulatum 
Verbascum vacillans 
Verbascum × vajdae 
Verbascum vandasii 
Verbascum vanense 
Verbascum × varciorovae 
Verbascum varians 
Verbascum × versiflorum 
Verbascum × vidavense 
Verbascum virgatum 
Verbascum × vlassianum 
Verbascum × vodnense 
Verbascum vulcanicum 
Verbascum × vuyckii 
Verbascum wiedemannianum 
Verbascum wilhelmsianum 
Verbascum wraberi 
Verbascum xanthophoeniceum 
Verbascum yemense 
Verbascum yurtkuranianum 
Verbascum zaianense 
Verbascum × zlataroffii

References

Verbascum